The 2001–02 Maltese FA Trophy (known as the Rothmans Trophy for sponsorship reasons) was the 64th season since its establishment. The competition started on 23 December 2001 and ended on 23 May 2002 with the final, which Birkirkara won 1-0 against Sliema Wanderers.

First round

|colspan="3" style="background:#fcc;"|23 December 2001

|-
|colspan="3" style="background:#fcc;"|30 December 2001

|}

Second round

|colspan="3" style="background:#fcc;"|3 April 2002

|-
|colspan="3" style="background:#fcc;"|10 April 2002

|}

Quarter-finals

|colspan="3" style="background:#fcc;"|11 May 2002

|-
|colspan="3" style="background:#fcc;"|12 May 2002

|}

Semi-finals

Final

References

External links
 RSSSF page

Malta
Maltese FA Trophy seasons
Cup